This is a list of musicians from Romania.

Classical 

 Alberta Alexandrescu (1978–present), pianist and chamber musician
 Filaret Barbu (1903–1984), composer, well known for the operetta Ana Lugojana
 Pascal Bentoiu (born 1927), Modernist composer
 Tiberiu Brediceanu (1877–1968), composer and folklorist
 Nicolae Bretan (1887–1968), opera composer, also baritone, conductor and critic
 Eduard Caudella (1841–1924), composer, wrote the first Romanian opera, Petru Rareș
 Sergiu Celibidache (1912–1996), composer and conductor
 Paul Constantinescu (1909–1963), composer, especially of religious and vocal music, also wrote music for Romanian films
 Vladimir Cosma (born 1940), composer, conductor and violinist
 Dimitrie Cuclin (1885–1978), classical music composer, musicologist, philosopher, translator and writer
 Constantin Dimitrescu (1847–1928), composer of Peasant Dance
 Grigoraș Dinicu (1889–1949), composer best known for his violin showpiece Hora staccato
 Sabin Drăgoi (1894–1968), composer and folklorist, one of the pioneers of scientific gathering of Romanian folklore
 George Enescu (1881–1955), composer, violinist, pianist, conductor and teacher
 Valentin Gheorghiu (born 1928), pianist and composer
 Ion Ivanovici (1845–1902), composer of The Danube Waves waltz
 Mihail Jora (1891–1971), "the father of Romanian ballet"; works include Intoarcerea din adâncuri and La piață
 Nicolae Kirculescu (1903–1985), composer of theatre and film music, including the theme of the television programme Teleenciclopedia
 Dumitru Georgescu Kiriac (1866–1928)
 Dinu Lipatti (1917–1950), pianist and composer
 Cristian Matei (born 1977), composer
 Marcel Mihalovici (1898–1985), composer
 Anton Pann (1790s–1854), wrote Romania's national anthem and music for the Orthodox Divine Liturgy
 Ionel Perlea (1900–1970), composer and conductor
 Ciprian Porumbescu (1853–1883), composer
 Doina Rotaru (born 1951), composer of mainly orchestral and chamber works
 Constantin Silvestri (1913–1969), composer, lived in England
 Matei Socor (1908–1980), composer and musician
 Cornel Trăilescu (born 1926), opera composer and conductor
 Anatol Vieru (1926–1998), composer of symphonic, chamber and choral music; winner of Herder Prize in 1986
 Ion Voicu (1923–1997), violinist
 Teo Milea (born 1982), pianist and composer

Contemporary 

Some of the most prominent contemporary musicians of Romania:

Avant-garde
 
 Ana-Maria Avram
 Iancu Dumitrescu
 Octavian Nemescu
 Ştefan Niculescu
 Octave Octavian Teodorescu
 Horațiu Rădulescu

Cafe singers
 Jean Moscopol (pre-war singer reminiscent of Carlos Gardel)
 Gică Petrescu
 Cristian Vasile

House/Dance
 
 3 Sud Est
 Activ
 Akcent
 Alexandra Stan
 David Deejay
 Deepcentral
 Deepside Deejays
 DJ Project
 DJ Sava
 Edward Maya
 Fly Project
 Haiducii
 Inna
 Morandi
 Play & Win
 Randi
 Radio Killer
 Tom Boxer

Electronica
 
 Mihai Crețu
 Adrian Enescu
 DJ Project
 Octave Octavian Teodorescu
 Shukar Collective
 Sunday People
 Șuie Paparude

Folk
 
 Mircea Baniciu
 Dorin Liviu Zaharia
 Ducu Bertzi
 Mircea Florian
 Tudor Gheorghe
 Adrian Ivanițchi
 Florian Pittiș
 Ion Dolănescu
 Dumitru Fărcaş
 Fărâmiță Lambru
 Gabi Lunca
 Ion Miu
 Romica Puceanu
 Ileana Sararoiu
 Maria Tănase
 Gheorghe Zamfir
 Fanfare Ciocărlia
 Mahala Raï Banda
 Taraful Haiducilor

Psych-folk/world fusion
 Dorin Liviu Zaharia

Folkloric/Ethnic/World
 
 Ion Dolănescu
 Dumitru Fărcaş
 Fărâmiță Lambru
 Gabi Lunca
 Ion Miu
 Romica Puceanu
 Ileana Sararoiu
 Maria Tănase
 Gheorghe Zamfir
 Fanfare Ciocărlia
 Mahala Raï Banda
 Taraful Haiducilor

Hip-Hop, Rap

 
 B.U.G. Mafia
 C.T.C. Controlul Tehnic de Calitate
 La Familia
 Paraziţii
 R.A.C.L.A.
 Zale

Jazz, Acid jazz
 Anca Parghel
 Johnny Răducanu
 Aura Urziceanu
 Harry Tavitian
 Blazzaj

Pop

 
 Mihai Trăistariu
 3rei Sud Est
 Activ
 Antonia
 Akcent
 Blaxy Girls
 Andreea Bălan
 Ştefan Bănică, Jr.
 The Cheeky Girls
 Razvan Fodor
 Elena Gheorghe
 Hara
 Hi-Q
 Krypton
 Delia Matache
 Mirela
 Morandi
 Loredana
 Nicole Cherry
 Nicola
 O-zone
 Spitalul de Urgenţă
 Cleopatra Stratan
 Taxi
 Voltaj
 Radu Sirbu
 Inna
 Corina

Rock and Metal

 
 Altar
 Bucovina
 Byron
 Cargo
 Celelalte Cuvinte
 Goodbye to Gravity
 Grimus
 Iris
 Krypton
 Kumm
 Luna Amară
 Magica
 Negură Bunget
 Octave Octavian Teodorescu
 Pasărea Colibri
 Timpuri Noi
 Phoenix
 Trooper
 Transsylvania Phoenix
 Valeriu Sterian
 Zdob şi Zdub

See also

 List of Romanians
 Lists of musicians
 List of Romanian composers

References

 
Romanian
Musicians

ro:Listă de muzicieni români